The winter climbing salamander (Bolitoglossa hiemalis) is a species of salamander in the family Plethodontidae.
It is endemic to Colombia.
Its natural habitat is subtropical or tropical high-altitude grassland.

References

hiemalis
Amphibians of Colombia
Endemic fauna of Colombia
Amphibians described in 2001
Taxonomy articles created by Polbot